A list of films produced in Egypt in 1982. For an A-Z list of films currently on Wikipedia, see :Category:Egyptian films.

External links
 Egyptian films of 1982 at the Internet Movie Database
 Egyptian films of 1982 elCinema.com

Lists of Egyptian films by year
1982 in Egypt
Lists of 1982 films by country or language